2nd Marine Brigade may refer to:

2nd Marine Brigade (Iran)
2nd Marine Division (South Korea) which operated as the 2nd Marine Brigade in the Vietnam War